This is a list of mayors of Tulsa, a city in the U.S. state of Oklahoma. Mayors of Tulsa are elected for four year terms.

Mayors of Tulsa

Notes

See also
 Timeline of Tulsa, Oklahoma

References
General

Political Graveyard–Mayors of Tulsa, Oklahoma
City Officials at website of Tulsa City Auditor Phil Wood (archived by WebCite here)

Specific

External links

Tulsa

History of Tulsa, Oklahoma